Clinical Trials, subtitled as Journal of the Society for Clinical Trials, is a peer-reviewed academic journal covering clinical trials and related subjects in the field of medical research methodology. It is published six times a year by SAGE Publications on behalf of The Society for Clinical Trials (SCT). The journal's main editor is Colin Begg (Memorial Sloan Kettering Cancer Center).

Abstracting and indexing 
Clinical Trials is abstracted and indexed in: Current Contents, MEDLINE, Scopus, and the Social Sciences Citation Index. According to the Journal Citation Reports, its 2016 impact factor is 2.715, ranking it 56th out of 128 journals in the category "Medicine, Research & Experimental".

Scope 
Clinical Trials is dedicated to advancing knowledge on the design and conduct of clinical trials related research methodologies. Covering the design, conduct, analysis, synthesis and evaluation of key methodologies, the journal remains on the cusp of the latest topics, including ethics, regulation and policy impact.

References

External links 
 
 The Society for Clinical Trials (SCT) official website

SAGE Publishing academic journals
English-language journals
Publications established in 2004
General medical journals
Biostatistics journals